Ketapang or Tau-pang in Teochew is the capital city of Ketapang Regency (Kabupaten Ketapang), one of the regencies of West Kalimantan province on the island of Borneo in Indonesia. Ketapang is served by the Ketapang Airport (Rahadi Osman Airport).

History

Ketapang is named from the local Malay name for ketapang tree (Terminalia catappa).

In 1936, Ketapang regency became one of the Afdeling (district in Dutch) in Keresidenan Kalimantan Barat (Residentis Western Afdeling van Borneo). In 1956, Ketapang regency became an autonomous regency in West Kalimantan province, and led by a regent (bupati).

Administration
In formal Indonesian administrative subdivision, Ketapang is not a city. The name of Ketapang is only referred for Ketapang Regency. Although there is no exact border of the city, most of the government offices and the central of business of Ketapang Regency are located in Delta Pawan District (Kecamatan Delta Pawan) and because of that the district is considered as the capital of the regency. The district itself is located on the delta of the Pawan River.

Economy
The main industries consists in the production of palm oil, rubber and wood. And also there are some mining like alumina, bauxite, zircon sand and lead (Batu Galena)

Education
There are 37 high schools operated by state, private and religious institutions. The city has a polytechnic (Politeknik Ketapang, opened in 2008) 
and an Open University (Universitas Terbuka).

Health
The three hospitals located in the city are RSUD Dr. Agoesdjam (public hospital), RS Fatima (private hospital), and RS Permata Bunda (private hospital).

Demographics
Ketapang is a multicultural city. It has a large population of Chinese. Madurese and Javanese are significant minorities, in terms of size. Most Chinese residents in Ketapang are of either Teochew or Hakka descent with Teochew being the majority. Because of this, Teochew is the main dialect used among Chinese residents in Ketapang. The native Indonesians living there are mainly of Malay and Dayak descent.  In regards to speech, most citizens of Ketapang incorporate a type of Malay accent in their Indonesian, which is somewhat similar to that used in Malaysia.

Transportation

Ketapang is served by the Ketapang Airport (Rahadi Osman Airport). The airport has some connecting flights to Pontianak and Semarang via Pangkalan Bun. Since February 2011, Ketapang also has direct flight to Jakarta, by Aviastar. Aviastar stopped the service in 2018. Ketapang can also be reached via ship from Pontianak (a six-hour speedboat ride, departing Pontianak daily at 6 am). The ship also stopped the service in 2018. But there are some ship from Teluk Melano, 2 hours drive from Ketapang and home pick-up included, to Pontianak every day.  Pontianak's airport serves flights to Jakarta.
By 2019, it is possible to drive to Pontianak by car in about 12 hours passing Trans-Kalimantan road.

Main sights

Gunung Palung National Park, a  rainforest park that can be reached from Ketapang. It was once wholly part of Ketapang regency, but now only a small part is, the rest in the regency that is named Kayong Utara or North Kayong (created 2007). Kayong is the nickname of Ketapang.
Pematang Gadung, The Peat Forest, the home of wild Orangutan.
Kelenteng Tua Pek Kong (大伯公), a Chinese temple.
Tugu Ale-ale. Ale-ale is a kind of shell.
Beaches in Ketapang   include Sungai Jawi beach (10 km from the city), Tanjung Batu beach (35 km), and Pulau Datok beach (80 km).
Makam Raja-Raja Tanjungpura (Tanjungpura Royal Cemetery), 3 hour from Ketapang city, by motorcycle and small boat that carries motorcycle through a section of road that is flooded. The flooded section is being repaired in 2019.

Notable people  
 Daud Yordan, boxer.
 Hamzah Haz, a former Indonesian vice President, born in Ketapang.

Villages
 

Pematang Gadung

See also
 Teochew dialect, a common dialect of Chinese residents in Ketapang.
 Roman Catholic Diocese of Ketapang

References

External links

  Official website
 Local news 
  http://www.savegporangutans.org (Gunung Palung Orangutan Conservation Program)
 Aviastar Airlines - Direct from Jakarta to Ketapang
 Sights and Sounds of Ketapang Blog
 http://biodiversityofpematanggadung.blogspot.com/
  http://ketapangcityku.blogspot.com/2012/07/makam-raja-tanjungpura-ketapang.html
  http://visit-ketapang.weebly.com/tanjungpura-kingdom.html
 Go West Kalimantan http://www.goarchi.com/archo/provinces/w-kalim/w-kalimtour.html
 Kalimantan as a Tourism Destination http://www.extremeborneo.com/Kalimantan_Destinations.html
 http://www.thefreelibrary.com/The+kingdom+of+Ulu+are+in+Borneo's+history%3A+a+comment.+(Research...-a093792581

 
Populated places in West Kalimantan
Port cities and towns in Indonesia
Regency seats of West Kalimantan